Agathon was an Athenian poet.

Agathon may also refer to:
Agathon (monk), Egyptian Christian monk
Agathon (mythology), son of King Priam of Troy
Agathon (son of Tyrimmas), an officer of Alexander the Great
Agathon (son of Philotas), the brother of Ancient Macedonian Generals Parmenion and Asander
Agathon (name), a given name
Agathon, a genus of flies